Gondang Winangoen is the one and only sugar museum in Southeast Asia. The museum is located in Klaten, Central Java. It was founded in 1982 to coincide with the 1982 World Sugar Congress which was held in Jakarta.

References

Museums in Central Java
Food and drink museums
History museums in Indonesia